The 2004 Palm Beach Gardens Challenger was a women's professional tennis tournament played on clay courts. It was the 2nd edition of the Palm Beach Gardens Challenger, and was an ITF $50,000 tournament from 2003 to 2005. It took place at the Palm Beach Gardens Tennis Center in Florida from November 29 to Dec 5, 2004.

WTA entrants

Seeds

 Rankings as of October 25, 2010.

Other entrants
The following players received wildcards into the singles main draw:
  Megan Falcon
  Carly Gullickson
  Milangela Morales

The following players received entry from the qualifying draw:
  Ekaterina Afinogenova
  Salome Devidze
  Petra Rampre
  Neha Uberoi

The following players received entry via the Lucky loser spot:
  Kateryna Bondarenko
  Mandy Minella
  Christina Wheeler

Champions

Singles

 Sessil Karatantcheva def.  Sania Mirza, 3–6, 6–2, 7–5.
 It was Karatantcheva's 1st title of the year and the 4th of her career.

Doubles

 Līga Dekmeijere /  Nana Miyagi def.  Kelly McCain /  Kaysie Smashey, 6–3, 6–2.
 It was Dekmeijere's 6th title of the year and 12th of her career
 It was Miyagi's 1st title of the year and 31st of her career

References
 http://www.itftennis.com/procircuit/tournaments/women's-tournament/info.aspx?tournamentid=1100010426

Tennis tournaments in the United States